Hesperozygis is a genus of shrubs or subshrubs in the family Lamiaceae. The species are all endemic to southern and southeastern Brazil.

Species 
 Hesperozygis dimidiata Epling & Mathias   
 Hesperozygis kleinii Epling & Játiva 
 Hesperozygis myrtoides (A.St.-Hil. ex Benth.) Epling 
 Hesperozygis nitida (Benth.) Epling 
 Hesperozygis rhododon Epling 
 Hesperozygis ringens (Benth.) Epling 
 Hesperozygis spathulata  Epling

Cultivation 
Several hybrids are in cultivation. Hesperozygis hybrida×Satureja hybrida as Hesperozygis 'Sunrise Mojito' and Hesperozygis kleinii×(H. myrtoides×H. dimidiata) as Hesperozygis 'Midnight Mojito'.

References

Lamiaceae
Lamiaceae genera
Endemic flora of Brazil